Médine may refer to:

Places
 Medina, Saudi Arabia
 Médine, Mali, a village and principal settlement (chef-lieu) of the commune of Hawa Dembaya in the Cercle of Kayes in the Kayes Region of south-western Mali

People
 Médine (rapper) (born 1983), French rapper
 Medine Erkan (born 1995), Turkish women's footballer